Güero is a restaurant serving Mexican cuisine in Portland, Oregon's Kerns neighborhood, in the United States. The restaurant specializes in tortas.

The restaurant opened in February 2017 and was named "Portland's 2017 Rising Star restaurant" by The Oregonian contributor Ben Waterhouse.

The Portland Mercury included Güero in a 2019 overview of the city's 50 "best multi-cultural restaurants and food carts".

See also
 Hispanics and Latinos in Portland, Oregon
 List of Mexican restaurants

References

External links

 
 
 Guero at the Food Network
 Güero at Lonely Planet
 Güero at Zagat

2017 establishments in Oregon
Kerns, Portland, Oregon
Mexican restaurants in Portland, Oregon
Northeast Portland, Oregon
Restaurants established in 2017